Nenko Dobrev (born 21 December 1946) is a Bulgarian rowing coxswain. He competed at the 1972 Summer Olympics, 1976 Summer Olympics and the 1980 Summer Olympics.

References

1946 births
Living people
Bulgarian male rowers
Olympic rowers of Bulgaria
Rowers at the 1972 Summer Olympics
Rowers at the 1976 Summer Olympics
Rowers at the 1980 Summer Olympics
Sportspeople from Plovdiv
Coxswains (rowing)
World Rowing Championships medalists for Bulgaria